is a Japanese actress. She won the award for best actress at the 17th Blue Ribbon Awards for Kinokawa. She is professor at Tokyo University of Social Welfare and serves as the 2nd head of Nihon Taishōmura theme park.

Life 
Yōko Shōji (庄司 葉子) was born on August 20, 1934, in Tottori Prefecture, to a family of cotton merchants who had settled in Yumihama. Her family is a branch of the Shōji family, the landed magnate of Watari. She is the niece of businessman and politician Shōji Ren.

Tsukasa attended Tottori Prefectural Sakai High School and graduated from Kyoritsu Women's Junior College.

When she was scouted by Ryō Ikebe to become an actress, it was met with great objection from her uncle Shōji Ren. According to Ren's associate Yasuda Mitsuaki, Ren told Tsukasa and Ikebe that "I could not show my face to [our] honorable ancestors if the Shōji clan would produce a riverbank beggar [lowly actor]. If you would do this, you will be cut out from the family for a kalpa [forever]." After this, Ikebe asked something to be done about Ren's opinion. Despite the great objection by her uncle, Tsukasa still decided to pursue a career as an actress.

She married politician and attorney Hideyuki Aizawa. Their son Hiromitsu married singer and actress Shoko Aida.

Filmography

Films
Meoto zenzai (1955)
A Holiday in Tokyo (1958)
Life of an Expert Swordsman (1959)
The Birth of Japan (1959)
Late Autumn (1960)
Yojimbo (1961)
The End of Summer (1961)
Chūshingura: Hana no Maki, Yuki no Maki (1962)
Kinokawa (1966)
Samurai Rebellion (1967)
Scattered Clouds (1967)
Goyokin (1969)
Shinsengumi: Assassins of Honor (1969)
Prophecies of Nostradamus (1974)
 Rhyme of Vengeance (1978)
Mifune: The Last Samurai (2015)

Television
Daichūshingura (1971)
Haru no Sakamichi (1971), Lady Kasuga
 Ōoku (1983)
Ohisama (2011)

Honours
Medal with Purple Ribbon (2003)
Order of the Rising Sun, 4th Class, Gold Rays with Rosette (2010)

References

External links
 Official website 

1934 births
Japanese film actresses
Living people
Actors from Tottori Prefecture
20th-century Japanese actresses
Recipients of the Medal with Purple Ribbon
Recipients of the Order of the Rising Sun, 4th class